The 2021 Arachas Super 50 Cup was the 50 over section of the seventh Women's Super Series competition, taking place in Ireland. The tournament ran from April to June, alongside the Twenty20 Arachas Super 20 Trophy. Due to the continuing impact of the COVID-19 pandemic, only two teams competed in the tournament, compared to three in seasons before the pandemic. Scorchers won the tournament, winning four of the seven matches.

Competition format
In the Super 50 Cup, the two sides played each other in seven 50 over matches between April and June. The tournament worked on a league system.

The league worked on a points system with positions being based on the total points. Points were awarded as follows:

Win: 2 points. 
Tie: 1 point. 
Loss: 0 points.
Abandoned/No Result: 1 point.

Squads

Source: CricketWorld

Points table

Source: ESPNCricinfo

Fixtures

Statistics

Most runs

Source: CricketArchive

Most wickets

Source: CricketArchive

References

External links
 Series home at ESPN Cricinfo

Women's Super Series
2021 in Irish cricket